The Elk Valley Rancheria is a rancheria and federally recognized tribe of Tolowa and Yurok people. It is located in the CDP of Bertsch-Oceanview, Del Norte County, California, just east of Crescent City.  As of the 2010 Census the population was 99.

Education
The ranchería is served by the Del Norte County Unified School District.

History
Elk Valley Ranchera was originally founded in the early twentieth century with the intent to provide for displaced Native Americans. The ranchera was held in trust by the United States until the California Ranchera Termination Act in 1958. In 1983, Hardwick V. United States created the "1983 Stipulation" allowed Elk Valley Ranchera to reform their lands into a United States held trust and be recognized as a tribe.

See also
 List of Indian reservations in the United States

References

External links
 Elk Valley Rancheria

Tolowa
Yurok
Federally recognized tribes in the United States
Native American tribes in California
American Indian reservations in California
Del Norte County, California